This is a complete list of drivers and teams who have competed in the World Touring Car Championship since the 2005 season.

Drivers
Key

This list is accurate up to and including the 2015 FIA WTCC Race of Qatar on 27 November 2015.

References

 
Lists of auto racing people